Rasmus Degerman (born 23 April 2001) is a Finnish professional footballer who plays for RoPS, as a midfielder.

References

2001 births
Living people
Finnish footballers
Rovaniemen Palloseura players
Veikkausliiga players
Association football midfielders
21st-century Finnish people